Barabanki is a city and a municipal board in the Indian state of Uttar Pradesh. It is administrative headquarters of Barabanki district. The city is about 30 km east of Lucknow, the state capital. It has a population of 146,831 with a density of 331.00 per square kilometre (860.0/sq mi).

History

The Barabanki district was first established by the British upon their annexation of Oudh State in 1856. Originally, the district was known as Daryabad district because its headquarters were at Daryabad, but in 1859 they were relocated to Barabanki. The name "Barabanki" was chosen for the district's official name over "Nawabganj", then the more common name of the town, for two reasons: first, to avoid any possible confusion with other places calleed Nawabganj, and second, because the civil station was technically located outside of Nawabganj in the small revenue village of Barabanki. Previously, under the Nawabs of Awadh, the area that would become Barabanki district was divided between five chaklas: Daryabad-Rudauli, Ramnagar, Dewa-Jahangirabad, Jagdispur, and Haidargarh.

Geography

Climate
Barabanki has tropical savanna climate (koppen Aw). The summers here are extremely hot due to proximity to tropics. The temperatures in the summer soar up to 40 to 45. Monsoon last from mid June to mid September. Winters are mild as it has tropical climate. In winters day time temperature rises up to 26 to 29, and at night drop up to 11 degrees.

Demographics 
As per provisional data of the 2011 census, the Barabanki urban agglomeration had a population of 146,831, with 77,766 males and 69,065 females. The literacy rate was 81.85%.

Barabanki District is classified by the national government as a "Minority Concentrated District in India" and Barabanki city is classified as a Muslim-majority city in the government files.

Administration 
Barabanki city comprises:
 Barabanki village (revenue village)
 Nawabganj (tehsil)
 Banki (town area)
 Barel (village)
 Satrikh (village)
 Kurauli (village)
 252 Bomb Disposal Company (cantonment)
 Suburbs

Places of interest
Parijaat tree, Kintoor

Transport

By Road

National Highway 28 (NH-28) passes through the district. It is well connected to other cities by means of roadways. Passenger road transport services in Uttar Pradesh started in 1947 with the operation of bus service on the Lucknow–Ayodhya-Gorakhpur route by UP Government Roadways.

National Highway 27 (India)
Barabanki-Lakhimpur (NH727H)
Barabanki-Nepalganj Border (NH927)
Lucknow-Ayodhya-Gorkhapur-Guwahati Highway (NH27)

Expressway

Purvanchal Expressway is an 340 km long, 6 lane wide (expandable to 8) greenfield expressway project in the state of Uttar Pradesh, India.
It will pass through 9 districts including Barabanki.

By Rail

Barabanki Junction railway station is the intercity rail station and a commuter rail hub in the Indian city of Barabanki. It has been important junction since the days of British control of India. In its category it is one of the important stations in NER. The Barabanki Junction railway station is on the Delhi– Basti– Gorakhpur main broad-gauge route in Uttar Pradesh. Barabanki Junction is also the hub for the Barabanki–Lucknow Suburban Railway. Barabanki railway station lies in the zone of high density stations.

By Air
The nearest airport to Barabanki is Chaudhary Charan Singh International Airport at Amausi, Lucknow which is approximately 40 km from Barabanki.

Education

Schools and intermediate colleges
 Anand Bhawan School, Barabanki city
 Government Inter College, Barabanki city
 Jawahar Navodaya Vidyalaya, Sonikpur, Trivediganj, Barabanki
 Pioneer Montessori Inter College, Barabanki city
 Saint Anthony's Inter College, Barabanki city
 Saraswati Shishu Mandir, Barabanki city
 Saraswati Vidya Mandir Inter College, Barabanki city
 Shiv Ram Singh Inter College, Pallhari Bypass, Barabanki

Engineering colleges
 Jahangirabad Institute of Technology, Jahangirabad
 Sagar Institute of Technology & Management, Faizabad Road

Polytechnic institute
 Government Polytechnic Barabanki, Jahangirabad Road

Other professional institutions
 Jahangirabad Media Institute, Jahangirabad

Research institutions
 International Rice Research Institute - branch Tikarhar Road, Kursi, Barabanki

Notable people

Khumar Barabankvi, poet
Suroor Barabankvi, poet
Mohsina Kidwai, politician
Rafi Ahmed Kidwai, politician
C. M. Naim, scholar of Urdu language and literature
Naseeruddin Shah, film actor
Waris Ali Shah, Sufi Saint
K. D. Singh, hockey player
Beni Prasad Verma, politician, Member of Parliament

Gallery

References

External links
 

 
Cities and towns in Barabanki district
Cities in Uttar Pradesh